Local Now (stylized as "local now") is an American over-the-top internet television service owned by The Weather Group, LLC, a subsidiary of Entertainment Studios. A spinoff of The Weather Channel, Local Now primarily provides a cyclic playlist of weather, news, sports, entertainment and lifestyle segments, incorporating localized content through feeds geared to a user-specified area.

Originally developed as a hybrid TV Everywhere service intended for subscribers of virtual multichannel video programming distributors (vMVPD), after it was acquired by Entertainment Studios in 2018, Local Now converted to a free-to-access model and has since expanded into a hybrid advertiser-supported streaming service, adding advertising video on demand (AVOD) content through digital linear channels and a selection of VOD programming supplied by Entertainment Studios, and various news providers and independent content distributors.

Local Now's programming is streamed live on the network's website; through apps for Amazon Fire TV, Android, iOS, and Roku devices; and linear pay television via Dish Network (as an app on internet-connected Hopper set-top boxes), YouTube TV, FuboTV and Sling TV. The service is operated from The Weather Channel's corporate headquarters in Atlanta, Georgia by a skeleton crew of three staff members.

History
On September 9, 2015, in published reports regarding The Weather Channel's planned overhaul of its programming schedule that would refocus on forecast-based news shows and weather-related reality/documentary programs as well as pending layoffs of around 50 of TWC's 1,400 employees, sources within The Weather Company (then the corporate parent of The Weather Channel) revealed that the consortium would launch a localized weather, news and traffic service intended for over-the-top streaming services offering tiered "skinny bundles" of cable-originated television channels.

The service, which was named Local Now, would maintain a format similar to that of Weatherscan, a digital cable and satellite network featuring localized weather forecasts and traffic reports, which original TWC parent Landmark Communications launched in 1999. Developed as part of its plan to place emphasis on its internet and mobile properties, The Weather Company intended to distribute Local Now to OTT providers in lieu of or in conjunction with The Weather Channel.

In preparation for the service's launch, The Weather Channel reached agreements with various information service providers to offer content for Local Now to supplement its in-house weather data and video content. Initial partners included the Associated Press, which provides headlines and video for its local and then showbiz news segments; Sportradar, a sports information agency which provides sports scores and schedules for its local sports segment; INRIX, which provides real-time incident data sourced from intelligent transportation systems; and TrafficLand, a traffic video integration service that provides footage from cameras maintained by state departments of transportation. The Weather Channel collaborated with Arris Global Services to provide technological management services for Local Now, handling design and integration, test validation, deployment, customized HTML software development and managed services. Local Now utilizes integration of the company's transcoders and Anevia's ViaMotion+ packaging software, and was the first service to implement CPE virtualization technology from ActiveVideo (a cloud video provider operated as joint venture of ARRIS and Charter Communications).

Local Now launched on January 25, 2016, initially exclusive to subscribers of Sling TV that, at minimum, receive its base "Best of Live TV" tier, with support for Amazon Fire TV, Android devices (including Android TV), and Google Chromecast. The service was designed with younger news consumers in mind, allowing a viewer to get constantly updated local news, weather, sports and traffic information in a condensed format at any time of the day. As noted by Freddy Flaxman, chief operating officer of The Weather Group (which became The Weather Channel's corporate parent after IBM purchased The Weather Company's digital assets in January 2016), this allows Local Now to better compete in a media landscape where consumers are increasingly consuming local news content via the Internet and smartphone apps, instead of waiting to watch long-form newscasts that air between one and five times per day on most major network affiliates and some independent stations.

On March 4, 2016, Local Now launched a channel on Roku, which provides live streams of the service's national and local feeds to OTT subscribers who use Roku's digital media players. On May 13, 2016, The Weather Channel announced that it would unveil standalone Local Now mobile apps for Apple and Android devices, which would extend access to the channel to cable and satellite subscribers who receive TWC. The apps, which were made available on the Apple App Store and Google Play on June 8, provide live streams of Local Now's 226 local feeds and The Weather Channel, accessible by entering an authenticated login from a participating conventional or over-the-top MVPD provider (those who do not subscribe to a participating provider can view the Local Now feeds via a 30-day free trial, in which users must enter their email address in the login dialog to send a linked message to their account which grants them access).

On December 14, 2016, The Weather Group announced a multi-year distribution agreement with fuboTV, in which Local Now and The Weather Channel would be included as part of an expanded service set to launch in early 2017, designed to compete with Sling TV and other OTT competitors such as PlayStation Vue and DirecTV Now, that would offer 70+ broadcast and cable networks.

On February 28, 2017, as part of Google's unveiling of YouTube TV, the company announced – through a carriage agreement with NBCUniversal – that Local Now and The Weather Channel would be among the channels included as part of the over-the-top MVPD service's initial lineup when it launched in select major U.S. cities that spring. YouTube TV did not include Local Now in its channel offerings at launch, and would not begin carrying the service until December 11, 2018. On March 27, 2017, The Weather Channel signed an agreement with OTT financial news channel Cheddar to provide daily business news updates for Local Now. On October 11, 2017, Dish Network began offering Local Now via an application on all generations of its internet-connected Hopper DVR set-top boxes; severe weather notifications provided by Local Now/The Weather Channel were also made available based on the user location. The following month on November 29, Xumo began offering the service as a premium digital channel through its Channel Plus tier for LG Electronics devices on channel IP-126.

On March 22, 2018, Entertainment Studios (owned by comedian and producer Byron Allen) announced its intent to acquire The Weather Channel's television assets from an NBCUniversal/Blackstone Group partnership. The actual value is undisclosed, but was reported to be around $300 million; the channel's non-television assets, which were separately sold to IBM two years prior, were not included in the sale. On May 24, 2018, The Weather Group announced it had reached a content partnership with Tronc-owned news syndication service Tribune Content Agency (TCA) to provide supplementary community-focused content for the service's local news segments. On July 18, The Weather Group announced it had reached a content partnership with Yelp to provide recommendations, reviews, images, and videos of top local restaurants and bars in each Local Now market for the network's "Tasty Stuff" segment.

Distribution and market coverage
Although a spinoff of The Weather Channel, Local Now is formatted as a general news and weather channel. Because of the distribution structure of over-the-top subscription television, Local Now utilizes a version of TWC's IntelliStar unit – installed at The Weather Channel's uplink site in Atlanta – that are configured differently from that used by The Weather Channel and Weatherscan, allowing for the recycling of segments featured in one news block seamlessly into another and routine updating of segments to each of the localized feeds. Local Now's automated model – which leverages The Weather Channel's existing infrastructure and technology, and employs only three staff members – allows Local Now to be offered at a fraction of the retransmission rates charged by local broadcast stations. Users of the Local Now website and mobile app, and subscribers of over-the-top MVPD providers carrying the channel, are able to access their local feed based on ZIP code, by their IP address via geolocation, or by manual selection, allowing subscribers to access a feed from another city when they travel outside of their home market.

, Local Now programs 226 individual feeds covering 207 of the 210 U.S. media markets that provide local news, weather and traffic content tailored to those communities (the St. Joseph, Missouri, Presque Isle, Maine and Zanesville, Ohio markets are served by the Kansas City, Bangor and Columbus area feeds by default), with 15 of them operating as subfeeds offering hyperlocal content to individual regions of the New York City, Atlanta, Denver and Dallas markets. Most markets are served by a single local feed, though Local Now plans to eventually launch additional subfeeds for most markets to "deliver a greater degree of [aggregated content of] local relevance" than can be incorporated within a local television newscast due to the market's geographical size and time constraints.

Over-the-air (OTA) digital television coverage
, Local Now has current and pending affiliation agreements with 3 television stations in 3 television markets encompassing three states, covering 3.78% of the United States.

Programming and content
Local Now relies on information sourced from The Weather Channel and other content partnerships that the service maintains with the Associated Press, Reuters, Foursquare, American City Business Journals, Stadium, Cheddar, Pointslocal, SportRadar, the Internet Video Archive, TrafficLand, INRIX, Nextdoor, Fresco, FlightAware, the Tribune Content Agency and Yelp.  In addition to supplying forecast data and other featured content, The Weather Channel also provides simulcasts of its live, wall-to-wall coverage in the event that a severe weather event, winter storm or landfalling tropical system affects the United States (accompanied by a red lower-tenth banner denoting the live TWC simulcast). Unlike TWC, which carries the Local on the 8s segments during storm coverage, Local Now suspends all regularly featured segments – including local forecasts – during the TWC simulcasts, with time allocated to commercial breaks on TWC filled by a slide denoting that the simulcast will return following the break.

The channel originally featured a lower display line (LDL) similar to that seen on TWC at the bottom one-tenth of the screen, to display continuous weather information and inform viewers of current and forthcoming segments in tab form and the current time (the tab highlighting the segment being aired at the time cycled between the segment's title and a countdown clock). The national feed's LDL showed current conditions (denoting the sky condition, and cycling through the temperature, wind data and if applicable, apparent temperature) and daypart forecasts for 20 major U.S. cities, and the current time in all four time zones in the Contiguous U.S. The localized versions – which were keyed over the national LDL – cycled through current conditions and forecasts for cities within proximity of the metropolitan area, with the time bar corresponding to the local time zone. As part of a graphical overhaul on February 20, 2017, the LDL was replaced by a progress bar counting down the runtime of the current segment, which had previously appeared atop the LDL; the progress bar was eventually removed on March 1, 2018.

On June 26, 2018, Local Now began employing Sasha Rionda (a veteran anchor/reporter who previously worked for E!, CNN International and CNN en Español, among other news credits) as an on-air anchor to conduct certain national news and entertainment segments and provide occasional field reports. (The addition of Rionda coincided with a refresh of the app that allowed increased content selection functionality, chaptering functions, and advanced notifications and alerts.)

Cycle products
The service maintains a "wheel" schedule that cycles in randomized intervals of, depending on the collective length of the included segments, between 15 and 20 minutes in length. (Originally, these cycles started at approximately the top of each hour, though since June 26, 2018, the segment cycles start immediately upon the user accessing an appropriate local feed.) Some segments – particularly weather and sports segments – featured in the cycle are routinely updated throughout the hour, while others – particularly news and entertainment segments – are updated every three to six hours. Each content cycle includes the following regular segments (listed in order of broadcast):

Slogans 
 Just the Facts, Please (2016–2017)
 Places, People, Stuff (2017–2018)
 Stream On / Stream Your City (advertising; 2018–present)

See also
 FuboTV
 Haystack News
 IntelliStar
 LocalBTV
 NewsON
 Sling TV
 VUit
 The Weather Channel
 WeatherNation TV
 WeatherStar

References

External links
 

The Weather Channel
Former Comcast subsidiaries
English-language television stations in the United States
Weather television networks
Television channels and stations established in 2016